GCD may refer to:
 Great-circle distance
 Gardner Carton & Douglas, a former U.S. law firm
 GCD, Chinese Internet slang for the Chinese Communist Party
 General content descriptor, a wireless device file format
 Global Cities Dialogue, an international development organisation
 Global Credit Data, a credit data pooling organisation
 Grand Central Dispatch, a parallel computing framework
 Grand Comics Database
 Grant County Regional Airport, near John Day, Oregon, United States
 Greatest common divisor
 Binary GCD algorithm
 Polynomial greatest common divisor
 Lehmer's GCD algorithm
 Griffith College Dublin, in Dublin, Ireland
 Yukulta language, spoken in Australia